Charles Marville, the pseudonym of Charles François Bossu (Paris 17 July 1813 – 1 June 1879 Paris), was a French photographer, who mainly photographed architecture, landscapes and the urban environment. He used both paper and glass negatives. He is most well known for taking pictures of ancient Parisian quarters before they were destroyed and rebuilt under "Haussmannization", Baron Haussmann's new plan for modernization of Paris. In 1862, he was named official photographer of Paris.

Biography 
Marville's past was largely a mystery until Sarah Kennel of the National Gallery of Art and independent researcher Daniel Catan discovered that Marville's given name was Charles-François Bossu. That newly-found association allowed them to discover a variety of biographical information, including photographs of his family which had been considered lost to time. 

Bossu was born in 1813 in Paris. Coming from an "established" Parisian family, he trained as a painter, illustrator and engraver. He assumed the pseudonym Charles Marville around 1832, and began working in his field.  After 17 years, as an illustrator, he took up photography around 1850. He had no family, but a long-time companion was included in his will. He died in Paris in 1879.

Notes and references

Publications
Sarah Kennel. Charles Marville: Photographer of Paris 2013 University of Chicago Press

External links
 
 Le Monde, 12/11/2010, Un scoop du XIXe siècle : le photographe Marville s'appelait Bossu.
 "Picture Perfect Paris," by Richard B. Woodward, The Wall Street Journal, Oct. 22, 2013
 "Marville’s Vanished Paris," by Luc Sante, The New York Review of Books, Sept. 2013
 "Photographer Charles Marville at the Metropolitan Museum, New York," by Ariella Budick, March 1-2, 2014, Financial Times (London)
 "A Last Look at Old Paris, Before Demolition," by By Karen Rosenberg, The New York Times, Jan. 30, 2014

1813 births
1879 deaths
Artists from Paris
19th-century French photographers